Grand View Spire is a 5,821-foot-elevation (1,774-meter) sandstone pillar located in Colorado National Monument, in Mesa County of western Colorado, United States. It is also 0.32 mile immediately south of Independence Monument, and 0.27 mile northwest of another climbing destination, Kissing Couple. Its unofficial name relates to its position at the tip of Grand View Overlook, one of several scenic viewpoints along Rim Rock Drive.

Geology
The spire is composed primarily of cliff-forming Wingate Sandstone, which consists of wind-borne, cross-bedded quartzose sandstones deposited as ancient sand dunes approximately 200 million years ago in the Late Triassic. The caprock at the summit consists of fluvial sandstones of the resistant Kayenta Formation. The slope around the base of Grand View Spire is Chinle Formation. The floor of the canyon is Precambrian basement rock consisting of gneiss, schist, and granites. Precipitation runoff from this geographical feature drains to the Colorado River, approximately three miles to the northeast.

Climate
According to the Köppen climate classification system, Grand View Spire is located in a semi-arid climate zone. Summers are hot and dry, while winters are cold with some snow. Temperatures reach  on 5.3 days,  on 57 days, and remain at or below freezing on 13 days annually. The months April through October offer the most favorable weather to visit.

Climbing
Established rock climbing routes on Grand View Spire:

 Southwest Defile Route  –  – 3 pitches – First ascent 1961 by John Auld, John Kuglin, Gary Ziegler
 Relics – class 5.10 – 5 pitches – FA November 13, 1991, by Mike Baker, Michael Kennedy, Bob Wade

See also
 List of rock formations in the United States

Gallery

References

External links
 Weather forecast: National Weather Service
 Grand View Spire rock climbing: Mountainproject.com

Colorado Plateau
Landforms of Mesa County, Colorado
Colorado National Monument
North American 1000 m summits
Sandstone formations of the United States
Rock formations of Colorado
Climbing areas of Colorado